High affinity cGMP-specific 3',5'-cyclic phosphodiesterase 9A is an enzyme that in humans is encoded by the PDE9A gene.

The protein encoded by this gene catalyzes the hydrolysis of cAMP and cGMP to their corresponding monophosphates. The encoded protein plays a role in signal transduction by regulating the intracellular concentration of these cyclic nucleotides. Multiple transcript variants encoding several different isoforms have been found for this gene.

Inhibitors
 BAY 73-6691
 PF-04447943

References

Further reading